is an action video game released for the TurboGrafx-16 in 1993, the third game in the Bonk video game series.

Gameplay
Bonk 3: Bonk's Big Adventure brought the series many new gameplay elements, including candies that made the player shrink and grow, and cooperative multiplayer. The story is similar to that of the other Bonk games, putting the player character up against Evil King Drool and many new enemies in the Dinosaur Kingdom.

Release
The game was rereleased for the TurboDuo in 1994, with a new cover illustration by Marc Ericksen. Bonk 3: Bonk’s Big Adventure was the last North American HuCard and Super CD game released for the TurboGrafx-16. It was released for the Wii Virtual Console in Europe on August 31, 2007, and in North America on September 3, 2007. It was also released in Japan on the PlayStation Store on January 20, 2010, and on the Wii U Virtual Console June 25, 2014, the latter receiving a North American release on June 29, 2017.

Reception

Though two of Electronic Gaming Monthly'''s reviewers commented that Bonk 3 offers little new content to the Bonk series, all four of them praised the two-player cooperative mode, and all but one judged that the game maintained the Bonk series's tradition of excellent gameplay design, appealing cartoony graphics, and strong audio. They scored the TurboGrafx-16 version a 7.75 out of 10.

Reviewing the TurboDuo version, GamePro'' praised Bonk's variety of abilities, the cartoony graphics, and the CD audio, but criticized the pacing and controls and stated that it offers too little new content to be worthwhile to gamers who had already played the cartridge version.

References

External links 
 The Bonk Compendium (Covering all games and references to Bonk)

1993 video games
A.I Company games
Bonk (series)
TurboGrafx-16 games
TurboGrafx-CD games
Video games developed in Japan
Virtual Console games
Virtual Console games for Wii U
PlayStation Network games
Cooperative video games
Video game sequels